Viking activity in the Iberian peninsula seems to have begun around the mid-ninth century as an extension of Viking raids on and establishment of bases in Frankia in the earlier ninth century. While connections between the Norse and Eastern Islamic lands were well-established, particularly involving the Rus' along the Volga and around the Caspian Sea, relations with the Western edge of Islam were more sporadic and haphazard. Although Vikings may have over-wintered in Iberia, no evidence has been found for trading or settlement. Indeed, the Iberian peninsula may not have offered particularly wealthy targets, in the ninth to tenth centuries. Sporadic raiding continued until the end of the Viking Age.

The knowledge of Vikings in Iberia is mainly based on written accounts. There are archaeological findings of what may have been anchors of Viking ships, and some shapes of mounds by riversides look similar to the Norse longphorts in Ireland. These may have been ports or docks for Viking longships.

Terminology 

In medieval Latin sources about Iberia, the Vikings are usually referred to as normanni ('northmen') and gens normannorum or gens nordomannorum ('race of the northmen'), along with forms in l- like lordomanni apparently reflecting nasal dissimilation in local Romance languages, or others which have an obscure etymology, as leodemanorum or lotimanorum, frequent in Galician charters. In Arabic sources, they are referred to as majūs (مَجوس), but as this term denoted a wide range of non-Islamic foreigners (though not usually Iberian Christians), references to majūs in Arabic are not necessarily references specifically to Scandinavian raiders. The prominent early Arabic source Al-Mas‘ūdī also identified the 844 raiders on Seville partly as Rūs and (probably borrowing from Iberian Latin lordomanni) al-lawdh’āna, which may more specifically indicate Scandinavian raiders.

Non-violent contact
Aside from Viking raids in the Islamic Mediterranean, it has been imaged that there were also sustained diplomatic relations between the Vikings and the Islamic world. However, the key evidence, a thirteenth-century account by Ibn Diḥya, in which an Arab diplomat Al-Ghazāl ("the gazelle") is dispatched to a pagan court during the reign of Abd-ar-Raḥman II, has been shown neither clearly to refer to Vikings nor probably even to have happened. It is accepted, however, that in the tenth century the Jewish Hispano-Arabic merchant Ibrahim ibn Yakub Al-Tartushi travelled to the Scandinavian trading town of Hedeby in Schleswig.

As Scandinavians converted to Christianity and formed stable kingdoms, particularly around the eleventh century, opportunities for contact with Iberia changed, still involving raiding but also opportunities for visits associated with crusading or pilgrimage. One elegant example, portrayed in the thirteenth-century Orkneyinga saga,  is Røgnvaldr kali Kolsson (d. 1158), who recites this verse, amongst others, to Ermengarde, Viscountess of Narbonne:

First raid, 844

The first incursion of the Vikings in Iberia has been characterised as 'probably the most significant episode of the whole period of Viking activity in the South'. It is mentioned in Annales Bertiniani, and dated August 844, when a group from a plundering expedition entered the Garonne and reached Galicia. Despite storm damage, some proceeded to South-West Spain. This account is consistent with several later, but independent sources in Latin and Arabic. In particular, the late ninth- or early tenth-century Chronicle of Alfonso III adds that after plundering a number of coastal villages they were ultimately repulsed in the vicinity of Farum Brecantium (i.e. the Tower of Hercules). Ramiro I of Asturias  gathered troops in Galicia and Asturias for the counter-attack. After the Asturian victory, the Vikings continued their voyage in direction of Lisbon. While some authors consider that the reliability of this chronicle is open to doubt, others consider that other local chronicles confirm the arrival of the Norsemen.

Evidence for the subsequent development of the raid mainly comes from later, Arabic-language sources.  The earliest and most important of these, despite a number of implausible details, is Ibn al-Qūṭiyya.  Overall, it seems clear that after their raid on Galicia and Asturias, the Vikings proceeded south, raiding Lisbon and Seville. In the assessment of Ann Christys, 'that is perhaps as much as we can say for certain'. However, the Viking raid on Seville has attracted extensive scholarship in which researchers have attempted to extract a fuller history from late sources.

A local Galician legend also claims that when the Vikings arrived at the mouth of the river Masma, in northern Galicia, Gonzalo, the holy Bishop of the local diocese of Britonia, from atop of a hill prayed for protection from the heavens against the forthcoming attack: a major storm was unleashed, sinking most of the flotilla but a ship that could flee to warn the rest of the fleet. A series of early medieval rock castles placed atop hills and mountains with large visual field over the ocean, extending along the coasts of Galicia, have been tentatively identified as temporary shelters and watchtowers built by local communities or lords against Norse raids.

Second raid, 859-61

Vikings returned to Galicia in 859, beginning what seems to have been a three-year campaign, during the reign of Ordoño I of Asturias. The main source for these events are Arabic histories compiled by Ibn Ḥayyān in the eleventh century, though some near-contemporary Latin sources also mention the events, and later Latin sources offer more elaborate, but less reliable, accounts. In the assessment of Ann Christys, what can be known about the Viking raids on Iberia in 859-61 is thatThe expedition of 859–861, like that of 844, seems to have involved a single band of adventurers. Returning to the scene of Viking incursions in northern Iberia and al-Andalus, but meeting with little success, they sailed on to raid targets on the shores of the Mediterranean. Here they may have taken captives for ransom or to trade as slaves. Vikings seem to have over-wintered in Francia, perhaps waiting on the northern shore of the Mediterranean for favourable tides and currents to exit the sea through the Straits of Gibraltar. They may even have sailed to Italy, Alexandria and Constantinople.Some historians have given credence, however, to a range of accounts in late sources about raids in this period as evidence for this Viking incursion. Yet different sources mention different figures; not all potentially relevant raids recounted were necessarily by Vikings; and the sources are likely more to reflect the political context in which they were composed than actual events in 859–61. For example, on the basis of an account by Al-Bakrī it has been supposed that in 859 or 860, Vikings sailed through Gibraltar and raided the little Moroccan state of Nekor, and defeated a Moorish army. The raiders have been identified as the legendary Hastein and Björn Ironside, but this is based on modern extrapolation from already altogether unreliable medieval sources. There was a well-attested raid on Constantinople in 860, which may have been by Vikings and which has been associated with the raids on Iberia, but there is no evidence that the raid on Constantinople was by the same people who were active in the western Mediterranean at the time. Moreover, it is plausible that the Constantinople raiders came from the north by the river-routes running from the Baltic into the Black Sea (known in Old Norse as the Austrvegr). A story about an attack in the period 859–61 on Banbalūna (which could mean modern Pamplona but also the whole kingdom of Navarre), again, may or may not reflect activities of Vikings.

Raids in the 960s and 970s
Evidence for Viking activity in Iberia after 861 is sparse for nearly a century: while often late, and perhaps reflecting later efforts to construct histories of Viking depredation for contemporary political gain, a range of sources including Dudo of Saint-Quentin, Ibn Ḥayyān, and Ibn Idhārī, along with a number of charters from Christian Iberia, together afford convincing evidence for Viking raids on Iberia in the 960s and 970s.

Among the stories recounted in later sources about these events, the Chronicle of Sampiro and a number of later sources portray a raid in 968 led by one Gundered: a fleet of a hundred ships of Norsemen and Flemings arrives at the port of Iuncaria, intending to pillage Iria, but the Vikings are met at Fornelos  by the armies of Bishop Sisnando Menéndez, who is killed in the battle. After three years devastating and pillaging the land, they are defeated at the Cebreiro mountains by one Gonzalo Sánchez, who might be identifiable as either a Galician count, Gonzalo Sánchez, or, according to some authors, as William Sánchez of Gascony. Bishop Sisnando was responsible for the fortification of Santiago de Compostela, allegedly against the raids of Norse, Flemings, and other enemies who uses to raid the lands and shores of Galicia. Several Galician charters of later decades relate the destruction of monasteries and the suffering of the people as "dies Lordemanorum" ("day of the Northmen"); in particular one charter dated in 996 uses the location of an ancient fortress of the Norse, in the south bank of the Ulla river, as a landmark.

According to Ibn Idhārī, in 966 Lisbon was again raided by the Norse, this time with a fleet of 28 ships, but they were successfully repulsed. He recounts further raids in Al-Andalus, in a series of annalistic asides to narratives of events in Córdoba, for 971–72; these records chime with a note in the textually related, and not necessarily reliable, Anales Complutenses and the first group of the Anales Toledanos saying that Vikings attacked Campos (believed to refer to either Santiago or to the Campos Goticos in the province of Leon) in 970.

These activities are vaguely consonant with two thirteenth-century Scandinavian sources for the life of Eiríkr Blóðøx (the Historia Norwegiae and Ágrip) situating his death (implicitly in the 950s) in Spain while raiding. These two texts are not, however, representative of other accounts of Eiríkr's death (which is usually put in England) and they are unlikely to reflect tenth-century reality. Likewise, the probably thirteenth-century Knýtlinga saga imagines one Úlfr raiding Galicia in the later tenth century.

Raids in the eleventh century 

Quite extensive evidence for minor Viking raids in Iberia continues for the early eleventh century. The twelfth-century Chronicon Lusitanum claims Viking raids for 1008 and 1016, while the thirteenth-century Heimskringla portrays Óláfr Haraldsson, who later became king Olaf II of Norway, raiding Iberia en route to Jerusalem in 1015, striking settlements that might correspond to Castropol, Betanzos, Rivas de Sil and Tui. Although the reliability of these narratives is questionable, a 1015 charter records Amarelo Mestáliz selling land in northern Portugal to clear a debt incurred by ransoming his daughters:a great number of Vikings (Lotnimis) arrived in July and occupied the territory between the rivers Douro and Ave for nine months. These Vikings (Leodemanes) captured my three daughters, called Serili, Ermesenda and Faquilo, and reduced me to poverty, for, when they were about to sell their captives, I had no choice but to pay to Vikings (Lotmanes) a ransom of silver for them.Likewise a few years later the crew of a 'barca de Laudomanes' ('ship of Vikings') took the following ransom for a woman called Meitilli and her daughter: a cloak, a sword, a shirt, three pieces of linen, a cow and some salt.

Dated in 1024, a royal charter of king Alfonso V of León annexed the bishopric of Tui to that of Santiago, because the city had been ravaged by the gens Leodemanorum, and the local Bishop and many other were captured and took afar, while other people have been sold or assassinated. Another royal charter, from Oviedo and dated to 1028 (possibly forged, but presumably intended to be plausible), recounts how one Felix fled royal disfavour aboard Viking ships (before later returning and receiving an estate from the Queen). A royal charter of king Veremud III of León, dated in 1032, narrates a recent battle of the forces of count Rodrigo Romaniz, including Norsemen allies, against a troop of Basque marauders who had occupied a stronghold in Mt. Lapio, near Lugo. And in 1068 Bishop Cresconius of Iria fortified Santiago, after in 1055 specifying that people could be exempt from resting on a Sunday in the event of an attack by Saracens or Vikings, indicating that he at least considered Vikings to be a threat. He also rebuilt a number of strongholds and castles protecting the seaways into Compostela, including the Torres de Oeste and the fortress of A Lanzada.

As the Viking Age drew to a close, Scandinavians and Normans continued to have opportunities to visit and raid Iberia while on their way to the Holy Land for pilgrimage of crusade, or in connection with Norman conquests in the Mediterranean. Key examples in the saga literature are Sigurðr Jórsalafari (king of Norway 1103–1130) and Røgnvaldr kali Kolsson (d. 1158).

Vikings in Madeira
Tenth- or eleventh-century fragments of mouse bone found in Madeira, along with mitocondrial DNA of Madeiran mice, suggests that Vikings also came to Madeira (bringing mice with them), prior to colonisation by Portugal.

Did Vikings prompt navy- and fortification-building in Iberia? 

Various historians have suggested that the well evidenced development of naval forces and fortifications across the Iberian peninsula during the tenth and eleventh centuries can be partly attributed to Viking activity. For example, it has also been suggested that the first navy of the Emirate of Córdoba was built in response to the raid of 844, and according to Fletcher "Alfonso III was sufficiently worried by the threat of Viking attack to establish fortified strong points near his coastline, as other rulers were doing elsewhere". It is clear, however, that a wide range of factors were encouraging these developments, and that key stages do not correlate with known Viking activity.

Appearances in popular culture 
Viking raids in Iberia feature prominently in Frans G. Bengtsson's 1940s novel Röde Orm.

Since 1961, the Viking Festival of Catoira, Pontevedra in Galicia (Spain), reenacts a Viking troop landing on their shores.
It is celebrated with Galician music and food.

Further reading

Primary source collections

 Dozy, R. P. A. (ed. and trans.), Recherches sur l’histoire et la littérature d’Espagne, 2 vols (Leiden: Brill, 1881). Translates the most important Arabic sources into French, alongside relevant Latin chronicles and charters (vol. 2, pp. 250–315).
 Seippel, A. (ed.), Rerum normannicarum fonts arabici, 2 vols (Oslo: Brøgger, 1896). Collection of Arabic sources for Vikings.
 Birkeland, H. (ed. and trans.), Nordens historie: Middlealderen etter arabiske kilder (Oslo: Dyburad, 1954). Translates and expands the sources edited by Seippel into Norwegian.
 Samarra’i, Alauddin I. (trans.), Arabic Sources on the Norse: English Translation and Notes Based on the Texts Edited by A. Seippel in ‘Rerum Normannicarum fontes Arabici’ (unpublished doctoral thesis, University of Wisconsin–Madison, 1959).
 
 Morales Romero, E., Os Viquingos en Galicia (Santiago de Compostela: USC, 1997). In Galician.
 Morales Romero, E., Historia de los vikingos en España (Madrid: Ediciones Miraguano, 2004). In Spanish.
 Vitorino Pires, Hélio Fernando (2012). Incursões Nórdicas no Ocidente Ibérico (844-1147): Fontes, História e Vestígios (PDF). pp. 120–161. Retrieved 26 July 2018. in Portuguese.

Secondary sources
Mil Anos da Incursão Normanda ao Castelo de Vermoim, ed. by Mário Jorge Barroca, Armando Coelho Ferreira da Silva (Porto: CITCEM – Centro de Investigação Transdisciplinar Cultura, Espaço e Memória, 2018),

References

Viking Age in Spain
Military history of Al-Andalus
Battles involving the Vikings
Battles involving the Emirate of Córdoba
9th century in Al-Andalus
10th century in Al-Andalus
11th century in Al-Andalus
840s conflicts
844